Kamal Ibrahim may refer to:

Kamal Ibrahim (soccer) (born 1992), Australian soccer player
Kamal Ibrahim (presenter) (born 1985), Irish television presenter and model
Kamal Ibrahim (wrestler), Egyptian Olympic wrestler